Variscite is a hydrated aluminium phosphate mineral. It is a relatively rare phosphate mineral. It is sometimes confused with turquoise; however, variscite is usually greener in color. The green color results from the presence of small amounts of trivalent chromium.

Geology
Variscite is a secondary mineral formed by direct deposition from phosphate-bearing water that has reacted with aluminium-rich rocks in a near-surface environment. It occurs as fine-grained masses in nodules, cavity fillings, and crusts. Variscite often contains white veins of the calcium aluminium phosphate mineral crandallite.

It was first described in 1837 and named for the locality of Variscia, the historical name of the Vogtland, in Germany.  At one time, variscite was called Utahlite. At times, materials which may be turquoise or may be variscite have been marketed as "variquoise". Appreciation of the color ranges typically found in variscite have made it a popular gem in recent years.

Variscite from Nevada typically contains black spiderwebbing in the matrix and is often confused with green turquoise.  Most of the Nevada variscite recovered in recent decades has come from mines located in Lander County and Esmeralda County, specifically in the Candelaria Hills.

Notable localities are Lucin, Snowville, and Fairfield in Utah,  United States. Most recently found in Wyoming as well.  It is also found in Germany, Australia, Poland, Spain and Brazil.

Jewelry
Variscite has been used in Europe to make personal ornaments, especially beads, since Neolithic times. Its use continued during the Bronze Age and in Roman times, although it was not until the 19th century that it was determined that all the variscite used in Europe came from three sites in Spain, Gavá (Barcelona), Palazuelo de las Cuevas (Zamora), and Encinasola (Huelva).

Variscite is sometimes used as a semi-precious stone, and is popular for carvings and ornamental use due to its beautiful and intense green color, and is commonly used in silversmithing in place of turquoise.  Variscite is more rare and less common than turquoise, but because it is not as commonly available as turquoise or as well known to the general public, raw variscite tends to be less expensive than turquoise.

Gallery

See also
  (same etymology, as named from the ancient locality of Variscia in Germany)
 List of minerals

References

Aluminium minerals
Phosphate minerals
Orthorhombic minerals
Minerals in space group 61
Luminescent minerals
Gemstones
Hydrates